Jean Rustin (3 March 1928 – 24 December 2013) was a French painter and prominent figurative artist.

Biography
Rustin was born at Montigny-lès-Metz on 3 March 1928. At the age of 19 he moved to Paris where he studied at the School of Fine Arts, in the studio of Untersteller. During the 1950s he was mainly preoccupied with abstract painting but from the 1970s he embarked on figuration. He created a bizarre world of human figures, where an existential dead-end is transformed into fright, abhorrence, pity but also relief.

The artist stated that....."I realize that behind my artistic creation, behind the fascination for the naked body, there are twenty centuries of painting, primarily religious, twenty centuries of dead Christs, tortured martyrs, gory revolutions, massacres and shattered dreams [...] I realize that history and maybe art history are engraved on the body and flesh of men....."

The work of Rustin is relatively  unknown.
Until the late 1960s, his abstract painting had a large following in France.
However, while most European and American artists were widening the gap between themselves and the figurative traditions that preceded Modernism, Rustin started to swim against the current, a decision which cost him dearly in the short term.

Personal exhibits
 1959 -1969 : Galerie La Roue, Paris, France
 1980-1986 : Galerie Isy Brachot, Paris, France
 1986-1993 : Galerie Marnix Neerman, Bruges, Belgium
 Since 1993 : Rustin Foundation, Antwerp, Belgium
 1971 : ARC, Musée d'Art Moderne de la Ville de Paris, France, Catalogue
 1982 : Maison des Arts André Malraux, Créteil, Paris, France, Catalogue
 1994 : Städlische Galerie und Ludwig Institut, Schloss Oberhausen, Germany
 MAC, Sâo Paulo, Brazil Markiezenhof, Bergen op Zoom, the Netherlands, Catalogue
 1996 The Delfino Studio Trust, London
 Museum of Contemporary Art, University of São Paulo, Brazil
 1997 Museo de Arte Contemporaneo de la Universidade de Chile, Santiago, Chile
 2000 Veranneman Foundation, Brussels, Belgium, and Frissiras Museum, Athens, Greece
 2001 Halle Saint-Pierre and Galerie Marie Vitoux, Paris, France

Works in public collections
 Algeria: Musée National des Beaux-Arts, El Hamma
 Germany: Hamburger Kunsthalle
 Städtische Galerie et Ludwig Institut, Schloss Oberhausen
 England: British Museum, London
 Fitzwilliam Museum, Cambridge
 Museum and Art Gallery, Birmingham
 Brazil: Museum of Contemporary Art, University of São Paulo
 Chile: Museo de la Solidaridad Salvador Allende, Santiago
 Spain: Museu Nacional d'Art de Catalunya, Barcelona
 USA: Art Museum, Princeton University
 Hirshhorn Museum and Sculpture Garden
 Smithsonian Institution, Washington
 The New Orleans Museum of Art
 France: Centre National d'Art Contemporain, Paris
 Fond Régional d'Art Contemporain de Seine-Saint-Denis
 Fond Régional d'Art Contemporain, Rhône-Alpes
 Fond Régional d'Art Contemporain du Val-de-Marne
 Musée d'Art Moderne de la Ville de Paris

Monographs
 Rustin, Entretiens avec Michel Troche, textes de Bernard Noël et Marc Le Bot, Editions de l’Equinoxe, Paris, 1984.
 Edward Lucie-Smith, Rustin, London, 1991.
 Agnès Meray, Regards sur l'Œuvre de Jean Rustin, Thèse, Université de Paris I, 1992.
 Revue Enfers, Jean Rustin, April 1996, textes de Claude Roffat, Pascal Quignard, Agnès Meray, Jean Clair, Françoise Ascal, Edition Pleine Marge, Paris.

References
3. "L'enfant d'Ingolstadt" by author Pascal Quignard, 2018, (in French). Profiles Jean Rustin and reflects on his work. Chapters I, XXXI.

1928 births
2013 deaths
People from Montigny-lès-Metz
French artists